The Commonwealth Scholarship and Fellowship Plan (CSFP) is an international programme under which Commonwealth governments offer scholarships and fellowships to citizens of other Commonwealth countries.

History
The plan was originally proposed by Canadian statesman Sidney Earle Smith in a speech in Montreal on 1 September 1958 and was established in 1959, at the first Conference of Commonwealth Education Ministers (CCEM) held in Oxford, Great Britain. Since then, over 25,000 individuals have held awards, hosted by over twenty countries. The CSFP is one of the primary mechanisms of pan-Commonwealth exchange.

Organisation
There is no central body which manages the CSFP. Instead, participation is based on a series of bi-lateral arrangements between home and host countries. The participation of each country is organised by a national nominating agency, which is responsible for advertising awards applicable to their own country and making nominations to host countries.

In the United Kingdom of Great Britain and Northern Ireland, which is the biggest contributor to the Plan, this process is managed by the Commonwealth Scholarship Commission in Britain, a non-departmental public body, and funded by the Department for International Development. Since 2008, the Foreign and Commonwealth Office no longer contributes financially to the plan and the number and type of scholarships available for students from more developed Commonwealth countries (Australia, The Bahamas, Brunei Darussalam, Canada, Cyprus, Malta, New Zealand, and Singapore) to study in Britain has been reduced.. Other countries, such as Australia, no longer offer scholarships as part of the CSFP.

New reforms were developed to strategically align scholarships with mutual interests for business and innovation between Commonwealth nations. During the state visit of President Tony Tan to the UK in October 2014, Her Majesty Queen Elizabeth II announced that the Royal Commonwealth Society of Singapore would be re-established to promote the Commonwealth and to provide new Commonwealth Scholarships and Fellowships in Innovation for Singaporeans. The first Commonwealth Scholarship and Fellowship for Innovation were presented in August 2017 to Joshua Cheong and Dr Khoo Hsien Hui by the Rt. Hon. Sajid Javid.

Notable past Commonwealth Scholars and Fellows include

Politics
Kenny Anthony, Prime Minister of St. Lucia
George Brandis QC, 36th Attorney-General of Australia
Ross Cranston, Member of Parliament for Dudley North, United Kingdom of Great Britain and Northern Ireland
Bill English, Prime Minister of New Zealand
Babalola Borishade, Former Minister of Education, Aviation Nigeria
John Alexander Forrest, Member for Mallee, Australia
Leslie Gunawardana, Former Minister of Science, Sri Lanka
Hala Hameed, Maldivian Minister of State
Juma Athuman Kapuya, Minister of Labour, Employment and Youth Development
Kalombo Mwansa, Home Affairs Minister of Zambia
Satendra Nandan, Minister of Health and Social Welfare, Fiji
Rolph Payet, Seychellois Cabinet Minister
Kamla Persad-Bissessar, Prime Minister of Trinidad and Tobago
Carlos Simons, Member, Interim Advisory Council, Turks and Caicos Islands
Abdullah Tarmugi, Singaporean politician and MP
Michael Tate, Minister for Justice, Australia

Judiciary
Shirani Bandaranayake, 43rd Chief Justice of Sri Lanka
Patrick Keane, Judge of the High Court of Australia
Ross Cranston, Former Solicitor General of the United Kingdom of Great Britain and Northern Ireland
George W. Kanyeihamba, Judge of the Supreme Court of Uganda
Professor Vijender Kumar, Professor of Family Law, NALSAR University of Law
 Lord Thomas of Cwmgiedd, Lord Chief Justice of England and Wales

Government
Mark Carney, Governor of the Bank of England
Michael Omolewa, Permanent Delegate and Ambassador to UNESCO, Nigeria
Carolyn McMaster, Canadian Deputy High Commissioner to New Zealand
 Manumatavai Tupou-Roosen, Director General of the Pacific Islands Forum Fisheries Agency

Academia
B. K. Misra, Neurosurgeon
U. R. Ananthamurthy, Professor and writer, University of Mysore, Karnataka
Gunapala Amarasinghe, Professor of Ayurvedic Pediatrics, Institute of Indigenous Medicine, University of Colombo
Anisuzzaman, Emeritus Professor of Bengali, University of Dhaka
Richard Alexander Arnold, Professor of English, Alfaisal University in Riyadh
Ishbel Campbell,  British chemist researcher and lecturer. Held one of the first Commonwealth fellowships awarded to a woman.
Robert M. Carter, Director of Australia's Secretariat for the Ocean Drilling Program
Warrick Couch, astronomer, Director of the Australian Astronomical Observatory and President of the Australian Institute of Physics.
John Gallas, poet and educator
Professor Alan Robertson Gemmell Professor of Biology at Keele University (1950-1977)
Germaine Greer, Australian feminist author; former professor of English Literature and Comparative Studies at the University of Warwick
Robert Gavin Hampson, Professor of English, Royal Holloway, University of London.
Charles Jago, President of the University of Northern British Columbia
Karuppannan Jaishankar, Professor of Criminology, Raksha Shakti University, India
Abu Hena Mustafa Kamal, poet, songwriter & professor at University of Dhaka
Will Kymlicka, Canada Research Chair in Political Philosophy, Queen's University at Kingston
Nissim Mannathukkaren, Associate Professor, Dalhousie University Department of International Development Studies
Angus McIntosh, Forbes Professor of English Language and General Linguistics, University of Edinburgh
Lynette Mitchell, Professor in Greek History and Politics, University of Exeter
Bridget Ogilvie, Director of the Wellcome Trust
Pratapaditya Pal, Curator-Emeritus and formerly, Curator, Los Angeles County Museum of Art
Peng Tsu Ann, Professor of Mathematics, National University of Singapore
Raja Ramanna, chairman, Atomic Energy Commission of India
B. N. Suresh, Director, Vikram Sarabhai Space Centre
Ghulam Mohammed Sheikh, Professor of Art, Baroda University
Lalji Singh, Director, Centre for Cellular and Molecular Biology, Hyderabad
Sheung-Wai Tam, President Emeritus of The Open University of Hong Kong
Stephen Toope, President and Vice-Chancellor of the University of British Columbia
Sunil Kumar Verma, Principal Scientist, Centre for Cellular and Molecular Biology, India
Jeremy Waldron, Professor of law and philosophy, New York University School of Law
Alexandra Walsham, Professor of Modern History, University of Cambridge
Fiona Williams, Professor of Social Policy, University of Leeds
Kamta Prasad, former professor of economics, Indian Institute of Technology, Kanpur
Najma Akhtar, Vice Chancellor of Jamia Millia Islamia

Journalists
Edward Greenspon, Editor-in-Chief, The Globe and Mail, Canada
Charles Krauthammer, Pulitzer Prize–winning journalist
Chandan Mitra, Editor and managing director of The Pioneer, New Delhi

Performing Arts
Walter Learning, Founder of Theatre New Brunswick
Shyamaprasad, Leading Indian (Malayalam) film Director, President, Amrita Television

Social Entrepreneurs 

 Kirthi Jayakumar, Gender and Peace activist, Founder of The Red Elephant Foundation

References

External links 
CSFP website
Commonwealth Scholarship Commission in the United Kingdom website

Government scholarships
Commonwealth Family
Education awards
Student financial aid
Non-departmental public bodies of the United Kingdom government
Department for International Development
Scholarships in the United Kingdom
Education finance in the United Kingdom